The Royal Thai Naval Air Division or RTNAD is the Naval aviation of the Royal Thai Navy. The division was officially established on 7 December 1926. The RTNAD has two air wings and one Flying Unit of HTMS Chakri Naruebet, operating 23 fixed-wing aircraft and 26 helicopters from U-Tapao, Songkhla, and Phuket. The First Royal Thai Navy wing has three squadrons; the Second Royal Thai Navy wing has three squadrons and another wing for HTMS Chakri Naruebet Flying Unit.

History
The establishment Royal Thai Naval Air Division began in 1921, when the Admiral Prince Abhakara Kiartivongse gave an opinion to the Naval Command Council of Ministry of the Navy on 23 November 1921. The Naval Aviation Division was expedient to set up an air fleet using Sattahip as a base with 2 seaplanes. The Naval Command Council approved this proposal on 7 December 1926.

Later, the Royal Thai Naval Air Division has more aircraft living with Royal Thai Air Force Place there are some inconveniences so in 1957, the Navy built the Airport coming up at Ban Utapao, Rayong Province by using the navy budget during construction, the United States offered construction assistance and requested to use some parts of U-Tapao Royal Thai Navy Airfield in return.

Structure

The headquarters of Royal Thai Naval Air Division has 10 commanding units as follows:
Personnel Division
Intelligence Division
Operations Division
Logistics Division
Division of Communication and Information Technology
Budget Division
Technical Affairs and Flight Safety Division
Division of Engineering Plans
Administration Department
Finance Department

Commands
Royal Thai Naval Air Division is a combat unit under commissioned of Royal Thai Fleet. The aviation division is divided into 6 regiments, corresponding to one additional command unit namely; Wing 1 Regiment, Wing 2 Regiment, Air Operations Control Regiment, The Flight Station Regiment, Aircraft Maintenance and Repair Center Regiment, Security Regiment and one additional command unit of HTMS Chakri Naruebet Flying Unit.

Royal Thai Navy Airfields
U-Tapao RTNAF used for responsible tasked over the northern part of Gulf of Thailand.
Songkhla RTNAF used for responsible tasked over the southern part of Gulf of Thailand.
Phuket RTNAF used for responsible tasked over the Andaman Sea (Indian Ocean).
Chanthaburi RTNAF used as a frontal operating airfield for Royal Thai Marine Corps.
Narathiwat RTNAF used as a frontal operating airfield for Royal Thai Marine Corps.
Nakorn Phanom RTNAF used for support Riverine Patrol Regiment tasked along the Mekong River.

Squadrons
The following squadrons are currently active with the Royal Thai Naval Division.

Aircraft

Active aircraft

Historic aircraft

Rank structure

See also
 Admiral Prince Abhakara Kiartivongse 
 Royal Thai Armed Forces Headquarters
 Military of Thailand
 Royal Thai Army Aviation Center
 Royal Thai Army
 Royal Thai Air Force
 Royal Thai Marine Corps
 Royal Thai Naval Academy

References

External links

  
 Global Security – Thailand navy

Royal Thai Navy
Military units and formations of Thailand
Naval aviation units and formations
Air divisions (air force unit)
Military units and formations established in 1926